Lake Ilmenak is a lake in the Braslau Lakes National Park of northern Belarus.

Description
The banks are low and sandy. Two streams flow into the lake.

References
Блакітная кніга Беларусі. — Мн.: БелЭн, 1994.

Ilmenak